Cai Qian (pinyin: Cài Qiān; 1761–1809) was a Chinese sea merchant, considered by some a pirate during the Qing Dynasty era.

Biography 
Cai Qian was born in Tong'an District, which is a county in the prefecture of Quanzhou in Fujian, China. This information is, however, not consistent with the account found in other sources. For example, a contemporary scholar called Jiao Xun identified Zhangzhou as Cai's birthplace while official records show - based on a report by the governor-general of Fujian to the emperor (during Ruan Yuan's time as a governor) - that Cai came from the village of Xiapu, also in Tong'an County.

There is very little information about his early life except that he lived a hard life, first working as a peasant and then a fisherman. Due to starvation, he became a pirate in 1794. He was, thereafter, described by fellow pirates as small in stature but quite ambitious, stopping at nothing to rise through the ranks. He was said to have used his own wife to entice a rival into a trap. His cunning and ambition allowed him to thrive in the constantly warring gangs and pirate chieftains in the South China Sea.

At the height of his power, he and Cheung Po Tsai commanded hundreds of ships and thousands of pirates; he was Cheung's mate. They predated others on the seas of Fujian, Guangdong and Taiwan Strait and came to be considered a major threat to Chinese political stability. Because the British businessmen sold English guns to Cheung, the Qianlong Emperor became angry with the British. The Qianlong Emperor blamed George Macartney over this issue, leading to Chinese hostility towards the United Kingdom during the Chinese Rites controversy. In 1799, Cai married a weapons expert who spoke English. Her expertise may have been beneficial to their accumulation of wealth. Some diaries say her name was Lin Yuyau and that she had lived in Fangyuan, Changhua, Taiwan.

In 1802, Cai occupied  Xiamen's guns bases.

In 1804 and 1805 Cai and Cheung twice attacked Taiwan's provincial capital of Tainan but were defeated. In the battle of 1804, Cheung defeated the Qing fleet from Wenzhou. Within the next four years he fought many battles against Tsai and Cai, vowing to destroy their fleets.

In January 1808, Fujian and Zhejiang admirals nearly destroyed their fleet near Hong Kong through a battle which lasted one day and night. They succeeded in defeating their enemies, causing Qing's navy to begin fearing Cheung and Cai.

In 1809, Wang Delu, now the Captain General of Fujian Navy, surrounded Cai Qian off the coast of Wenzhou in Zhejiang. Lacking the strength to escape the encirclement, Cai committed suicide by shooting himself with a golden bullet.  Rumours claim that Cai had a great treasure which was hidden on Matsu Islands: it had never been found to this day.

References 

1761 births
1809 deaths
Hokkien people
Qing dynasty people
Chinese pirates
People from Xiamen
Suicides in Taiwan
19th-century pirates
18th-century Chinese businesspeople
19th-century Chinese businesspeople